Disney's Aladdin: The Series (commonly referred to as simply Aladdin) is an American animated television series produced by Walt Disney Television Animation that aired from February 6, 1994, to November 25, 1995, concluding exactly three years to the day from the release of the original 1992 Disney film of the same name on which it was based. Despite the animated television series premiering four months before the first sequel, the direct-to-video film The Return of Jafar, it takes place afterward. The second and final animated film sequel was the 1996 direct-to-video film, Aladdin and the King of Thieves.

The TV series was produced by Alan Zaslove and Tad Stones, who were already renowned for their work on Chip 'n Dale: Rescue Rangers and Darkwing Duck. Many of the films' stars provided the voices of their TV counterparts, with the notable exceptions of Dan Castellaneta filling in for Robin Williams in The Genie role (like in The Return of Jafar), until Williams later returns to reprise his role in Aladdin and the King of Thieves, and Val Bettin as the Sultan (who replaced Douglas Seale after the original film).

The TV series originally aired as a preview on The Disney Channel in early 1994, and in September of that year it began airing concurrently on the syndicated The Disney Afternoon block and on Saturday mornings on CBS (prior to Disney's purchase of rival ABC). Disney Channel reran the series from 1997 until 2000. The show was shown on Toon Disney from April 1998 until December 2008.

Plot
The series is set in the fictional sultanate of Agrabah. It takes place one year after the original film, and is set after the second film. Aladdin, now engaged to Princess Jasmine, embarks on numerous adventures with his companions.

Episodes

A total of 86 episodes were produced, making this series one of the few exceptions to Disney's then-limit of 65 episodes. The direct-to-video film Aladdin and the King of Thieves serves as the series finale. It was followed by a guest appearance on November 24, 1998, in "Hercules and the Arabian Night", an episode of Hercules: The Animated Series.

Characters

Main
Aladdin (voiced by Scott Weinger) was originally a street urchin who stole food to survive, but his life changed when he met and fell in love with Jasmine, the Princess of Agrabah. Aladdin is engaged to marry Jasmine and will eventually become Prince and eventually Sultan. He learns of his future responsibilities while protecting the kingdom from monsters, sorcerers and other dangers.
Genie (voiced by Dan Castellaneta) is one of Aladdin's best friends. Freed from his lamp and able to use his magic freely, Genie helps Aladdin in his adventures to protect Agrabah. However, Genie's magic does not always work successfully, as his powers had been reduced once he was freed. He describes his powers as "semi-phenomenal, nearly cosmic".
Princess Jasmine (voiced by Linda Larkin) was forced by her father to marry a prince, but her life changed for the better when she ran away from home and met and fell in love with the man of her dreams, Aladdin. Jasmine is no ordinary princess as she is strong-willed, independent, defiant yet loving and caring and quite flirty and seductive and wants to live a life where she is free to make her own choices and to not let others control her. Now with more independence, Jasmine starts to experience things that she had never done before.
Iago (voiced by Gilbert Gottfried): Though he may have cleaned up his act, Iago is still very greedy and constantly wishes to have riches and power in his life. Iago inadvertently causes trouble for the gang as he leads them on treasure hunts that turn out to be dangerous. Though he may be bad tempered, Iago has a good heart deep down and always does the right thing in the end. Iago also has the talent of being able to imitate other peoples' voices.
Abu (voiced by Frank Welker) is the charming, mischievous, yet closest friend of Aladdin. Abu is known to be a master thief and has his eyes set on gold and jewels. Abu and Iago have become good friends and work together on many occasions to gain money and riches beyond their wildest dreams.
Magic Carpet is a loyal friend who was once a resident of the Cave of Wonders' treasure room. He is the mode of transportation for Aladdin and his friends, as well as a constant games partner for Genie.
The Sultan (voiced by Val Bettin) is Jasmine's kind-hearted father, ruler of Agrabah, who allowed the engagement between her and Aladdin.

Other characters and villains
Eden (voiced by Valery Pappas)
Dhandi (voiced by Debi Derryberry)
Abis Mal (voiced by Jason Alexander)
Haroud Hazi Bin (voiced by James Avery)
Sadira (voiced by Kellie Martin)
Mozenrath (voiced by Jonathan Brandis)
Amin Damoola (voiced by Jeff Bennett)
Mechanicles (voiced by Charlie Adler)
Razoul / Prince Wazoo / The Sand Monster / Dominus Tusk / Hamar / Akbar (voiced by Jim Cummings)
Rajah / Hakim / Fazahl / Nahbi / Xerxes (voiced by Frank Welker)
Arbutus / General Gouda (voiced by Ron Perlman)
Khartoum (voiced by Tony Jay)
Fasir (voiced by Ed Gilbert)
Mirage (voiced by Bebe Neuwirth)
Aziz (voiced by Michael Bell)
Minos / King Zahbar (voiced by Keith David)
Fatima (voiced by Charity James)
Uncouthma (voiced by Tino Insana)
Chaos (voiced by Matt Frewer)
Saleen (voiced by Julie Brown)
Malcho (voiced by Héctor Elizondo)
Caliph Kapok / Amok Mon Ra (voiced by Tim Curry)
Thundra (voiced by Candi Milo)
Queen Deluca (voiced by Tress MacNeille)
Ayam Aghoul (voiced by Hamilton Camp)
Magma (voiced by Tone Loc)
Sootinai / Merc (voiced by Dorian Harewood)
Ajed Al Gebraic (voiced by Jonathan Harris)
Nefir Hasenuf (voiced by René Auberjonois)
Queen Hippsodeth (voiced by Kate Mulgrew)
Sultan Pasta Al Dente (voiced by Stuart Pankin)
Scara (voiced by Susan Tolsky)
Shaman (voiced by Malcolm McDowell)

Animation
The animated television series was animated by Walt Disney Television Animation (Australia) Pty. Limited, Walt Disney Animation Japan, Inc., Toon City Animation, Inc., in Manila, Philippines, Kennedy Cartoons in Manila, Philippines and Kennedy Cartoons in Toronto, Ontario, Canada, Guimarares Productions in São Paulo, Brasil, Moving Images International (working with Toon City on the show's episodes) in Manila, Philippines, Animal-ya (also known as Animal House), Tama Productions, Wang Film Productions Co., Ltd., Sunwoo Animation Co., Ltd., Jaime Diaz Producciones S.A., and Pacific Rim Productions, Inc. The additional production facilities for Walt Disney Animation (Japan) Inc.-animated episodes are Tama Production, Jade Animations, Light Foot, Nakumara Productions, Studios CATS, Studios Fuga, Studios Robin, Takahashi Productions, and Unlimited Energee.

Home media

VHS and LaserDisc releases
Nine VHS cassettes and two double-feature LaserDiscs containing eighteen episodes of the series were released in the United States and Canada (including four cassettes of the Princess Collection: Jasmine's Enchanted Tales set, which contain eight episodes).

Princess Collection - Jasmine's Enchanted Tales:

Australia and New Zealand releases
Twelve VHS cassettes containing 24 episodes of the series were released in Australia and New Zealand. The series' home video releases from North American and Europe were also available on VHS, LaserDisc and Video CD in Asia, the Middle East, South Africa, and South America.

DVD releases
The series has not been officially released on DVD, but on March 14, 2005, three episodes of the series were released on the Jasmine's Enchanted Tales: Journey of a Princess DVD release. Also, four episodes were released as part of the Disney Princess DVD releases.

Video on demand

Following the launch of the Disney+ video on demand streaming service in November 2019, Aladdin along with The Shnookums and Meat Funny Cartoon Show are the only two Disney Afternoon series not available on the platform as of April 2022.

International releases
The entire series is available for purchase on Amazon Prime Video in Germany.

Accolades

References

External links

1990s American animated television series
1994 American television series debuts
1995 American television series endings
TV series
American children's animated action television series
American children's animated adventure television series
American children's animated comedy television series
American children's animated fantasy television series
American sequel television series
Animated television shows based on films
CBS original programming
The Disney Afternoon
Disney Channel original programming
English-language television shows
First-run syndicated television programs in the United States
Genies in television
Interquel television series
Television series based on adaptations
Television series based on Disney films
Television series by Disney Television Animation
Television series set in fictional countries
Television series set in the Middle East
American television shows based on children's books
Television series created by Tad Stones
Television series created by Alan Zaslove